Maksim Eugenievich Moshkow (born 13 October 1966 in Moscow) is a public figure of the Russian Internet segment, the Runet.

He graduated from Moscow State University's Department of Mechanics and Mathematics. Since 1991 he has been an employee of the Scientific Research Institute of System Development, where he among other duties is administrating the campus local network. He also took up teaching courses on Unix, TCP/IP, HP OpenView, VMware.

Moshkow programmed some major media Internet projects like Gazeta.Ru, Lenta.Ru, Vesti.Ru, etc. as well as authoring Lib.ru also known as Maksim Moshkow's Library, which started to operate in November 1994 and proved to be the largest and most comprehensive Russian electronic library.

He is a laureate of the Internet Prize ROTOR-2005 as the "Man of the Year". He is married, and has one son and three daughters.

See also
Gevorkyan v. Moshkov

References

External links 
 Maksim Moshkow home page
 His internet library (Russian)

1966 births
Living people
Internet in Russia
Russian computer programmers